Erwan Regulus (born 15 May 2000) is a Guadeloupean footballer who plays as a goalkeeper for French side JA Drancy and the Guadeloupe national team.

Club career
Regulus began his career at AJC before joining the Stade Lamentinois youth setup. He was promoted to the first-team from the U19 squad and played one season in the local Guadeloupe Division of Honor before moving to Paris to continue his studies, where he was recruited by Philippe Lemaître, manager of National 2 side JA Drancy in the northeastern suburbs of the city. He signed a contract with the club in July 2019, even though they had just added veteran keeper Mignon N'Dingha. The 19-year-old made his team debut on 10 August 2019 as the starting keeper on the first matchday and kept a clean sheet in their win over Haguenau. He was named man of the match by Le Parisien for his performance in his second start, a 1–0 loss to SC Schiltigheim at home the following week.

International career
At the youth level, Regulus played with the Guadeloupe U20s at the 2018 CONCACAF U-20 Championship.

He made his senior international debut on 16 December 2019 in a friendly against the Dominican Republic, conceding a late penalty in the 1–0 defeat. National team manager Jocelyn Angloma had seen him play with Stade Lamentinois and called him to offer him the starting spot after an ankle injury sidelined regular starter Frédéric Tejou.

Career statistics

Club

Notes

International

References

External links
 
 
 

Living people
2000 births
Guadeloupean footballers
Guadeloupe international footballers
Guadeloupe under-20 international footballers
Association football goalkeepers
Stade Lamentinois players
JA Drancy players
Championnat National 2 players
Championnat National 3 players